Hans van den Doel (January 18, 1955 – September 22, 2010) was a Dutch politician of the People's Party for Freedom and Democracy (VVD). He served as Mayor of Anna Paulowna from June 1, 2009 until his death from pancreatic cancer on September 22, 2010.

References

1955 births
2010 deaths
Mayors in North Holland
Municipal councillors in North Holland
People from Andijk
People's Party for Freedom and Democracy politicians
People from Alkmaar
People from Anna Paulowna
Deaths from pancreatic cancer
Deaths from cancer in the Netherlands